Kygo Life AS is a lifestyle brand founded by the Norwegian artist Kygo (Kyrre Gørvell-Dahll) and entrepreneur Jon Inge Gullikstad in 2016 and is headquartered in Oslo, Norway. The company started with a collection of audio products and a complete line of fashion and accessories.

Products 
A9/600 Bluetooth headphones
The Kygo A9/600 is part of the Kygo Pro Line and was launched in 2017 and is the leading model of the audio collection. The A9/600 is the headset used by Kygo and comes in 5 different color variations. Scandinavian medias received the product very well and praised the excellent sound quality.

A7/800 Bluetooth headphones
The Kygo A7/800 was the first headset model launched in 2016 with the Kygo brand. This model was substituted by Kygo A9/600 through 2017 and 2018.

Awards 
Kygo Life works with Nordic design and advertising agencies and has been awarded the design excellence of its brand identity, packaging and website.
The Webby Awards 2017 - Webby Best Visual Design – Aesthetic for story.kygolife.com
ED Awards European Design Award 2017 - Gold for Promotional site for story.kygolife.com
Gulltaggen 2017 - Bronze for craft production on story.kygolife.com
The Lovie Awards 2017 - Best Design (Websites) for story.kygolife.com
Cresta International Advertising Awards 2017 - Bronze for visual design on story.kygolife.com
Gullblyanten 2016 - Silver for packaging design.

References

External links 
 
 kygomusic.com Kygo's official webpage

Consumer electronics brands
Fashion accessory brands
Norwegian brands
Companies based in Oslo
Norwegian companies established in 2016